Cyarubare is a district (akarere) of the Eastern Province of Rwanda (it was formerly in Kibungo Province).

References 
 

Districts and municipalities of Kibungo